Aure Church is a parish church of the Church of Norway in Aure Municipality in Møre og Romsdal county, Norway. It is located in the village of Aure. It is the church for the Aure parish which is part of the Ytre Nordmøre prosti (deanery) in the Diocese of Møre. The white, wooden church was built in a cruciform style in 1924 by the architect Nils Ryjord. The church seats about 800 people.

History
The earliest existing historical records of the church date back to the year 1432, but the church was not new that year. The church may have been first established here during the 10th century. The first church was dedicated to the Virgin Mary.

On 8 May 1726, the church was sold to a private landowner during the Norwegian church auction. This was done along with hundreds of other churches that the King of Denmark-Norway sold to help pay off the debts of the Great Northern War. The new church owner immediately decided to tear down the old church building and replace it with a new church on the same site. This new church was a timber-framed, cruciform design. It was completed in 1726–1727, but the records show that it took some time after that before all of the interior furnishings were completed.

In 1814, this church served as an election church. Together with more than 300 other parish churches across Norway, it was a polling station for elections to the 1814 Norwegian Constituent Assembly which wrote the Constitution of Norway. This was Norway's first national elections. Each church parish was a constituency that elected people called "electors" who later met together in each county to elect the representatives for the assembly that was to meet in Eidsvoll later that year.

In 1850, the church tower was taken down and rebuilt. In 1861–1864, the church was extensively restored on the inside to modernize the church and make room for more people to sit when they attended services there. During this renovation, it was discovered that the building could not withstand the weight of the new tower from 1850, so additional supports had to be added to the building. The church was later sold out of private ownership to the parish.

On 21 January 1923, the church burned down after being struck by lightning. Some of the historic items from the church were rescued from the building during the fire including the altarpiece and baptismal font. Planning for a replacement church began immediately. The new church was designed by Nils Ryjord and built in 1924. The new church was designed to be fairly similar to the previous church. It was consecrated on 24 October 1924.

See also
List of churches in Møre

References

Aure, Norway
Churches in Møre og Romsdal
Wooden churches in Norway
Cruciform churches in Norway
20th-century Church of Norway church buildings
Churches completed in 1924
10th-century establishments in Norway
Norwegian election church
Millennium sites